Ryan Cleckner is a former Army Ranger sniper and instructor with the 1st Ranger Battalion of the US Army. He is currently a constitutional law and firearms attorney, an adjunct university professor, founder of Gun University and Rocket FFL, as well as the author of the Long Range Shooting Handbook.

Cleckner served two tours in Afghanistan. After returning to his hometown of Arizona, Cleckner studied at the Arizona State University obtaining a degree in political science. He then enrolled at Quinnipiac University School of Law.

While studying, Cleckner joined another student, Brian Gregorio, and founded Veteran's Advocacy Group, a student organization dedicated to educating students about civilian-military relations, military careers and veterans' issues. In 2010, Cleckner also founded New Battlefront Foundation, a non-profit organization that aid veterans in their transition from military to civilian life.

In 2011, Cleckner appeared as a trainer in the second season of History Channel's marksmen competition show, Top Shot.  In a 2012 video filmed at Colby Donaldson's ranch, Cleckner shot a Barrett M82 while standing up and hit a target 1,000 yards away on his first shot.

Books

References

External links
 Ryan Cleckner
 Top Shot - Season 2: Ryan Cleckner
 Tucker Carlson Tonight: Ryan Cleckner
 Texas Triggers 1,0000 yd shot
 NRA TV: Cam & Co - Guest Ryan Cleckner
 

Living people
American male sport shooters
United States Army personnel of the War in Afghanistan (2001–2021)
Arizona State University alumni
Quinnipiac University alumni
United States Army Rangers
Year of birth missing (living people)